The lateral superior genicular artery is a branch of the popliteal artery that supplies a portion of the knee joint.

Course
It passes above the lateral condyle of the femur, beneath the tendon of the Biceps femoris.

Branching
It divides into a superficial and a deep branch; the superficial branch supplies the vastus lateralis, and anastomoses with the descending branch of the lateral femoral circumflex and the lateral inferior genicular arteries; the deep branch supplies the lower part of the femur and knee-joint, and forms an anastomotic arch across the front of the bone with the highest genicular and the medial inferior genicular arteries.

Additional images

See also
 Patellar anastomosis

References

Arteries of the lower limb